Kullen may refer to:
 Kullen, a promontory in Sweden, the site of Kullen Lighthouse
 Kullen Knoll, in Antarctica
 Kullen, a surname; people with the name include:
 Bob Kullen
 Nicole Kullen
 Sue Kullen

See also 
 King Kullen, American supermarket chain
 Kulen
 Cullen (disambiguation)